The 1941 Pittsburgh Steelers season was the franchise's 9th season in the National Football League (NFL). In the offseason, the team had been sold and then re-acquired (more or less) in a bizarre series of transactions which has come to be referred to as the "Pennsylvania Polka". The roster consisted of many players who had played for the Philadelphia Eagles the previous year, who joined the Steelers as a result of the moves.

Offseason

Bert Bell became half-owner of the team and he named himself the head coach. After starting the season with two straight losses, Aldo "Buff" Donelli was brought in. Donelli was acting concurrently as head coach at Duquesne University, and when the team's schedules prevented him from fulfilling both roles, he stepped down as the Steelers' coach in favor of Walt Kiesling. The team held training camp in Hershey, Pennsylvania.

Regular season

Schedule

Game Summaries

Week 1 (Sunday September 7, 1941): Cleveland Rams 

at Rubber Bowl, Akron, Ohio

 Game time: 
 Game weather: 
 Game attendance: 23,720
 Referee: 

Scoring Drives:

 Cleveland – Magnani 93 kick return (Adams kick)
 Cleveland – FG Adams 40
 Pittsburgh – Hackney 4 run (Sanders kick)
 Pittsburgh – Jones 34 run (Sanders kick)
 Cleveland – McDonough 10 pass from Hall (Adams kick)

Week 3 (Sunday, September 21, 1941): Philadelphia Eagles  

at Forbes Field, Pittsburgh, Pennsylvania

 Game time: 
 Game weather: 
 Game attendance: 12,893
 Referee: 

Scoring Drives:

 Philadelphia – FG Barnum 43
 Pittsburgh – Brumbaugh 4 run (Sanders kick)
 Philadelphia – Tomasetti 40 pass from DeSantis (Barnum kick)

Week 5 (Sunday October 5, 1941): New York Giants  

at Forbes Field, Pittsburgh, Pennsylvania

 Game time: 
 Game weather: 
 Game attendance: 13,458
 Referee: 

Scoring Drives:

 Pittsburgh – FG Niccolai 22
 New York – FG Marefos 24
 New York – Cuff 9 pass from Leemans (Cuff kick)
 Pittsburgh – Cichefski 72 pass from Brumbaugh (Niccolai kick)
 New York – Yeager 53 pass from Pugh (Marefos kick)
 New York – Poole 16 pss from Eshmont (Cuff kick)
 New York – Reagan 21 run (kick failed)
 New York – Reagan 8 run (Cuff kick)

Week 6 (Sunday October 12, 1941): Washington Redskins  

at Forbes Field, Pittsburgh, Pennsylvania

 Game time: 
 Game weather: 
 Game attendance: 30,842
 Referee: 

Scoring Drives:

 Washington – Todd 35 pass from Filchock (Materson kick)
 Pittsburgh – Riffle 10 pass from Donelli (Niccolai kick)
 Washington – FG Aguirre 39
 Washington – Todd 7 run (Masterson kick)
 Washington – R. Hare 7 run (Masterson kick)
 Pittsburgh – Jones 59 pass from McDonough (Niccolai kick)
 Pittsburgh – Brumbaugh 1 run (kick failed)

Week 7 (Sunday October 19, 1941): New York Giants  

at Polo Grounds, New York, New York

 Game time: 
 Game weather: 
 Game attendance: 34,604
 Referee: 

Scoring Drives:

 New York – Cope recovered blocked kick in end zone (Marefos kick)
 Pittsburgh – Looney 66 pass from Brumbaugh (Sanders kick)
 New York – Leemans 1 run (Cuff kick)
 New York – Marefos 1 run (Marefos kick)
 New York – Reagan 3 run (Marefos kick)

Week 8 (Sunday October 26, 1941): Chicago Bears  

at Wrigley Field, Chicago, Illinois

 Game time: 
 Game weather: 
 Game attendance: 17,212
 Referee: 

Scoring Drives:

 Chicago Bears – Osmanski 13 run (Snyder kick)
 Chicago Bears – McAfee 33 run (Snyder kick)
 Chicago Bears – Kavanaugh 45 pass from Luckman (Maniaci kick)
 Pittsburgh – Hoague 14 pass from Rivvle (Niccolai kick)
 Chicago Bears – Pool 56 pass from Luckman
 Chicago Bears – Gallameau 1 run (kick failed)

Week 9 (Sunday November 2, 1941): Washington Redskins  

at Griffith Stadium, Washington, DC

 Game time: 
 Game weather: 
 Game attendance: 30,755
 Referee: 

Scoring Drives:

 Washington – Moore 42 run (Masterson kick)
 Washington – FG Aldrich 17
 Pittsburgh – FG Niccolai 19
 Washington – Farkas 1 run (Aguirre kick)
 Washington – Carroll 25 interception (kick failed)

Week 10 (Sunday November 9, 1941): Philadelphia Eagles  

at Shibe Park, Philadelphia, Pennsylvania

 Game time: 
 Game weather: 
 Game attendance: 15,601
 Referee: 

Scoring Drives:

 Philadelphia – Castiglia 47 run (Basca kick)
 Pittsburgh – Jones 25 run (Sanders kick)

Week 11 (Sunday November 16, 1941): Brooklyn Dodgers  

at Forbes Field, Pittsburgh, Pennsylvania

 Game time: 
 Game weather: 
 Game attendance: 20,843
 Referee: 

Scoring Drives:

 Brooklyn – Manders 3 run (Condit kick)
 Pittsburgh – Riffle 1 run (Niccolai kick)
 Pittsburgh – Jones 25 run (Niccolai kick)

Week 12 (Sunday November 23, 1941): Green Bay Packers  

at Forbes Field, Pittsburgh, Pennsylvania

 Game time: 
 Game weather: 
 Game attendance: 4,593
 Referee: 

Scoring Drives:

 Pittsburgh – Hoague 1 run (Niccolai kick)
 Green Bay – Hinkle 3 run (kick failed)
 Green Bay – Hutson 8 pass from Isbell (kick failed)
 Green Bay – Hinkle 1 run (Hutson kick)
 Green Bay – Panell 26 fumble run (Hutson kick)
 Green Bay – Urban 12 pass from Canadeo (Adkins kick)
 Green Bay – Van Every 5 run (Adkins kick)
 Green Bay – Van Every 31 run (Adkins kick)
 Green Bay – Van Every 86 interception (Rohrig kick)

Week 13 (Sunday November 30, 1941): Brooklyn Dodgers  

at Ebbets Field, Brooklyn, New York

 Game time: 
 Game weather: 
 Game attendance: 12,336
 Referee: 

Scoring Drives:

 Brooklyn – Condit 6 run (Condit kick)
 Brooklyn – Condit 43 run (Condit kick)
 Brooklyn – Kracum 1 run (McAdams kick)
 Pittsburgh – Jones 6 run (Niccolai kick)
 Brooklyn – Shetley 25 lateral from Schwartz after 32 pass from Parker (Condit kick)
 Brooklyn – Kracum 17 run (Peace kick)

Standings

References 

Pittsburgh Steelers seasons
Pittsburgh Steelers
Pittsburg Pir